Câlnău may refer to several rivers in Romania:

Câlnău (Dâmbovița), a tributary of the Dâmbovița
Câlnău (Buzău), a tributary of the Buzău

See also 
 Câlnic (disambiguation)